Fabrice Grange (born 3 December 1971) is a French former professional footballer who played as a goalkeeper. He is a goalkeeping coach at Ligue 1 club Bordeaux.

References

1971 births
Living people
French footballers
Association football goalkeepers
Olympique Lyonnais players
OFC Charleville players
FC Nantes players
Liaoning F.C. players
Racing Club de France Football players
AS Beauvais Oise players

Association football goalkeeping coaches
French expatriate footballers
Expatriate footballers in China
French expatriate sportspeople in China
INF Vichy players
People from Sainte-Foy-lès-Lyon
Sportspeople from Lyon Metropolis
Footballers from Auvergne-Rhône-Alpes